

184001–184100 

|-id=011
| 184011 Andypuckett ||  || Andrew W. Puckett (born 1977), an American college professor dedicated to creating authentic astronomical research opportunities for undergraduates and other ambitious young students. He is a discoverer of minor planets. || 
|-id=064
| 184064 Miner || 2004 GM || Ellis D. Miner (born 1937) was a JPL astronomer and scientist on the science teams of Mariner and Viking spacecraft, Assistant Project Scientist for Voyager 1 and Voyager 2, and the Science Manager for Cassini–Huygens. He determined the rotational rate for asteroid 1566 Icarus in 1968 at JPL's Table Mountain Observatory. || 
|-id=096
| 184096 Kazlauskas ||  || Algirdas Kazlauskas (born 1949), Lithuanian astronomer and deputy director of the Institute of Theoretical Physics and Astronomy at Vilnius University || 
|}

184101–184200 

|-bgcolor=#f2f2f2
| colspan=4 align=center | 
|}

184201–184300 

|-id=275
| 184275 Laffra || 2005 AX || Maurice Laffra (1886–1936) established the Orchestre Symphonique du Creusot in 1920 and served as its conductor during 1920–1922 || 
|-id=280
| 184280 Yperion ||  || Hyperion (Yperion), from Greek mythology. The Trojan prince was one of the many sons of King Priam. || 
|}

184301–184400 

|-id=314
| 184314 Mbabamwanawaresa ||  || Mbaba Mwana Waresa is a Zulu goddess of rain, agriculture, and the harvest. She is the goddess of rainbows, a symbol of the link between heaven and Earth. She is particularly revered for teaching the people of Southern Africa the art of making beer (Umqombothi). || 
|-id=318
| 184318 Fosanelli ||  || Patrik Fosanelli (born 1945), an active French amateur astronomer, involved in spectroscopy research at the Osenbach Observatory  in France. || 
|}

184401–184500 

|-bgcolor=#f2f2f2
| colspan=4 align=center | 
|}

184501–184600 

|-
| 184501 Pimprenelle ||  || Caroline Christophe (born 1978), daughter of French amateur astronomer Bernard Christophe who discovered this minor planet. Her nickname, Pimprenelle, was a puppet character on the 1970s French television show Bonne nuit les petits || 
|-id=508
| 184508 Courroux ||  || The Swiss village of Courroux, located near Delémont in the Jura Mountains || 
|-id=535
| 184535 Audouze ||  || Jean Audouze (born 1940), French astrophysicist || 
|}

184601–184700 

|-id=620
| 184620 Pippobattaglia ||  ||  (born 1947), Italian science popularizer and author of numerous books on astronomy || 
|}

184701–184800 

|-id=778
| 184778 Kevinoberheim ||  || Kevin Oberheim (born 1983) is a civil engineer in the State of Maryland. His work helps provide for safe and reliable travel for thousands of people every day. || 
|-id=779
| 184779 Bericoberheim ||  || B. Eric Oberheim (born 1984) for his humanitarian efforts in Central America, and his continuing social work with non-governmental organizations. || 
|-id=784
| 184784 Bettiepage ||  || Bettie Page (1923–2008), an American model and actor who became known as The Queen of the Pin-ups. || 
|}

184801–184900 

|-id=878
| 184878 Gotlib ||  || Marcel Gotlieb (1934–2016), a French cartoonist from Paris known for the comics magazines L'Écho des savanes and Fluide Glacial || 
|}

184901–185000 

|-id=930
| 184930 Gobbihilda ||  || Hilda Gobbi (1913–1988), one of Hungary's most recognizable character actresses. || 
|}

References 

184001-185000